Álvaro de Vasconcelos was the Director of the European Union Institute for Security Studies between May 2007 and May 2012.

Career
Prior to this, he headed the Institute of Strategic and International Studies (IEEI) in Lisbon, of which he is a co-founder, from 1981 to 2007 where he launched several networks including the Euro-Latin American Forum and EuroMeSCo.

As well as being a regular columnist in the Portuguese and international press, he is author and co-editor of many books, articles and reports, notably in the areas of the EU's Common Foreign and Security Policy (CFSP), Euro-Mediterranean relations and on the theme of world order, such as Portugal: A European Story, La PESC: Ouvrir l'Europe au Monde, The European Union, Mercosul and the New World Order, and A European Strategy for the Mediterranean.

Personal life
Álvaro de Vasconcelos is a Chevalier of the Order of the Légion d’Honneur (France) and a Comendador do Ordem do Rio Branco (Brazil). He was married to the late Maria do Rosário de Moraes Vaz, Director of Programmes at the IEEI, Lisbon. He was first married to a French lady, Brigitte Courot with whom he had one daughter. With Rosário de Moraes Vaz he had two daughters.

List of publications

EUISS publications

Chaillot Papers
 Global security in a multipolar world, introduction by Álvaro de Vasconcelos, Chaillot Paper 118, October 2009
“Multilateralising” multipolarity, in ‘Partnerships for effective multilateralism’, Chaillot Paper 109, EUISS, June 2008
The EU and Iraq, in ‘Looking into Iraq’, Chaillot Paper 79, EUISS, July 2005
The war on terrorism, in ‘One Year On: Lessons from Iraq’, Chaillot Paper 68, EUISS, March 2004

Reports
The European Strategy and Policy Analysis System (ESPAS) 'Global Trends 2030 - Citizens in a Polycentric World', ESPAS Report, March 2012 (Editor)
What do Europeans want from NATO?, EUISS Report n° 8, November 2010 (coordinator)
A strategy for EU foreign policy, EUISS Report n° 7, June 2010 (edited and co-author)
The European Security Strategy 2003-2008 – Building on Common Interests, EUISS Report n° 5,February 2009 (edited and co-author)
The EU and the world in 2009, in  European perspectives on the new American foreign policy agenda, EUISS Report n° 4, January 2009 (edited and co-author)
Union pour la Méditerranée: le potentiel de l’acquis de Barcelone, EUISS Report nº 3, November 2008 (co-author)
Union for the Mediterranean – Building on the Barcelona acquis, EUISS Report nº 1, May 2008 (co-author)

Books
Quelle défense européenne en 2020? EUISS Book, juillet 2010 (French translation of 2009 book "What ambitions for European defence in 2020?")
The Obama Moment – European and American perspectives, EUISS Book, November 2009
What ambitions for European defence in 2020? EUISS Book, first edition July 2009 and second revised edition October 2009

Other publications

Articles and Papers
Articles in specialised journals, and major project reports
What ambition for European defence? ESDP Newsletter, Special issue, October 2009
L’Union européenne parmi les grandes puissances, Commentaire, Volume 31/nº 124, Hiver 2008-2009
Entender la seguridad de otro modo: una salida al impasse del proceso de Barcelona in Eduard Soler i Lecha y Laia Carbonell Agustín (eds.), VI Seminario Internacional sobre Seguridad y Defensa en el Mediterráneo. La seguridad humana, Fundació CIDOB, December 2008
“El día después de la cumbre”, Akfar/Ideas, nº 19, Fall 2008
Security for Africans, ESDP newsletter nº 5, December 2007
An Open Europe in a Multipolar World: Lessons from the Portuguese Experience, Notre Europe, Studies and Research 60, October 2007 (translated into French and Portuguese)
Looking South, The Parliament Magazine, Issue 249, 2 July 2007
Una Europa Mundo, El Pais, March 2007
Research priorities beyond the fog of culturalism, Challenges for Policy-oriented Research on the Middle East, SWP, March 2007
A Europa sem Fronteiras, Janus 2007, UAL & Jornal Público, 2007
Getting it Right: Inclusion within Diversity – Lessons of the ‘Cartoons Crisis’ and beyond, EuroMeSCo Report, 2006 (mimeo).
‘“Great Pond” Europeanization ?, La revue internationale et stratégique n° 61, IRIS, Spring 2006,
Reform-minded Portugal unsure over EU's value, Europe's World, nº 3, Summer 2006
Barcelona 2005: la cuestión democrática entra en escena, Anuario del Mediterraneo. Barcelona: IEMed./CIDOB, 2006.
A Arte da Paz, Relações Internacionais, 8, Lisbon: IPRI, December 2005
Democratic Security Ten Years On, Ten years of the Barcelona Process: results and new aims, CIDOB, 2005
A Dialogue of Civilization or “Inclusion within Diversity?” Eurofuture, Winter 2005
Os Caminhos do Multilateralismo activo,Second International Conference of Forte Copacabana, October, 2005
A Europa e um Novo Mandato de Bush: O Triunfo de Vénus, Política Externa, Vol. 14, nº 1, São Paulo: Paz&Terra, June–July–August 2005
L’européanisation, la voie à prendre ?, ‘Les fondements des politiques étrangères des États européens’, La revue internationale et stratégique, nº61, IRIS, printemps, 2006
Europe and Reform: Barcelona Now More than Ever, Arab Reform Bulletin, Vol. 3, Issue 3, April, 2005
Barcelona Plus. Towards a Euro-Mediterranean Community of Democratic States, EuroMeSCo Report, IEEI, April 2005.
A Hipóteses Europeia, Relações Internacionais, nº3, September 2004
Os Estados Unidos no futuro da Europa, Janus, UAL & Jornal Público, 2004
The EU and the Mediterranean Overhauling the Status Quo Policy, The International Spectator, Vol. XXXVIII (3), July–September 2003
The future of EMP, September 11 and the Future of the Euro-Mediterranean Cooperation, Carlo Masala, Edts., ZEI Discussion Paper, 2003
A Crise Europeia e a Ordem Mundial, Política Externa, Vol. 12, June–July–August, 2003
Perejil/Leila: Lessons for Europe, Piece for the Real Instituto Elcano website, 19 July 2002
A OSCE: Uma Peça no Processo de Inclusão Europeia, Instituto de Defesa Nacional, nº103, Autumn-Winter 2002
Europe's Mediterranean Strategy. An asymmetric equation, presented at The Convergence of Civilizations? Constructing a Mediterranean Region Conference, 6–9 June, Convent, Portugal (organised by University of California at Berkeley)
Seven Points on the Euro-Mediterranean Partnership, The International Spectator, 37, 2002

Books: Chapters in Collective Volumes
The European Union and Mercosul, in Mário Telò (coord.), European Union and New Regionalism. Regional Actors and Global Governance in a Post-hegemonic Era. Revised edition. Burlington, Vermont: Ashgate, September 2007.
Conversas com Embaixador José Calvet de Magalhães Europeístas e Isolacionistas na Política Externa Portuguesa, Álvaro de Vasconcelos (Eds), Bizâncio, Lisbon, 2005
Back to the future? Reviving Multilateralism, in Alfredo G. A. Valladão, Pedro da Motta Veiga (eds.), Political Issues in the EU-Mercosur Negotiations, Chaire Mercosur de Sciences Po, 2003.
L’Union européenne et la régionalisation du système international, in Mélanges en hommage à Jean-Victor Louis, Vol. I. Bruxelles: ULB, 2003.
The European Crisis and the World Order, in Hélio Jaguaribe and Álvaro de Vasconcelos (eds.), The European Union, Mercosul and the New World Order. Frank Cass, 2003.
European Foreign and Security Policy and Latin America, in Paolo Giordano (ed.), An Integrated Approach to the EU-Mercosur Association, Paris: Chaire Mercosur de Sciences Po, 2002.

Project Syndicate
Bush's dying days in Gaza, January 2009
Hamas's Ghost in Annapolis, November 2007
The “War on Democratization”, July 2007
The Islamic Democratic Paradox, February 2006
Fighting Terrorism Democratically, 2005
What Now? More Europe!, 2005
Kerry vs. Bush: Will Reason Prevail?, October 2004
Terror Or Reform In The Greater Middle East, March 2004

Portuguese Journals
O fim do carácter único da Europa?, Público, 21 January 2009
O efeito Obama, Público, November 2008
Na morte de um fazedor da Europa democrática, Público, July 2008
Mais e melhor Europa, Público, July 2008
Uma força europeia, para quê?, Público, August 2006
Dilema Islamita, Público, 16 February 2006
A América sem Alianças, Expresso, August 2004
Condições sine qua non de um plano Europeu, Expresso, May 2004
O preço a pagar, Expresso, October 2003
Pela Espanha!, Expresso, November 2003
O comboio da Europa, in Público, November 2003
Três mundos possíveis, in Expresso, June 2003
O Medo Português, in Público, December 2002
Europa sem Fronteiras, in Expresso, December 2002
O Efeito Lula, in Expresso, December 2002

IEEI Publications
O Mediterrâneo no centro da política mundial. Diálogo de civilizações ou «inclusão na diversidade»?, Estratégia Nº21, Bizâncio, 1º Semestre 2005
Desenvolvimento e Parcerias. Integração aberta e cidadania, Estratégia Nº20, Principia, 1º Semestre 2004
A Europa como actor internacional. Uma Federação às Avessas, Estratégia Nº18-19, Principia, 1º/2º Semestres 2003
Um facto político, Estratégia Nº17, Principia, 2º Semestre 2002
A União Europeia e a Ordem Internacional, Estratégia Nº16, Principia, 1º Semestre 2002 O Mundo em Português
O ano do Euro: ano da Europa?, O Mundo em Português Nº 28, Principia, January 2002
Os Direitos do Inimigo, Nº 29, O Mundo em Português Principia, February 2002
Manobras de Guerra e de Paz, O Mundo em Português Nº 30, Principia, March 2002
A Intervenção Que Falta, O Mundo em Português Nº 31, Principia, April 2002
A Fantástica Aventura, O Mundo em Português Nº 32, Principia, May 2002
A identidade post-nacional de Timor, O Mundo em Português Nº 33, Principia, June 2002
Viver com os outros, O Mundo em Português Nº 34/35, Principia, July/August 2002
A desordem imperial, O Mundo em Português Nº 36, Principia, September 2002
Intervenções urgentes, O Mundo em Português Nº 37, Principia,October 2002
Democracia tranquila, O Mundo em Português Nº 38, Principia, November 2002
A questão Turca, O Mundo em Português Nº 39, Principia, December 2002
3 votos para um ano decisivo, O Mundo em Português Nº 40, Principia, January 2003
O Iraque no futuro da Europa, O Mundo em Português Nº 41, Principia, February 2003
O Mundo que a Europa quer, O Mundo em Português Nº 42, Principia, March 2003
Vencer a paz, O Mundo em Português Nº 43, Principia, April 2003
Paradoxo democrático, O Mundo em Português Nº 44, Principia, May 2003
A Europa Mundo, O Mundo em Português Nº 45-47,Principia, June–July–August 2003
Império impossível, ordem improvável, O Mundo em Português Nº 45-47, Principia, September 2003
Os três Mundos, O Mundo em Português Nº 49, Principia, October 2003
Península da Europa, O Mundo em Português Nº 50, Principia, November 2003
Portugal, a defesa e o mundo, O Mundo em Português Nº 51-52, Principia, December 2003/January 2004
Odisseias, O Mundo em Português Nº 53, Principia, February 2004
A Europa e o Grande Médio Oriente, O Mundo em Português Nº 54, Principia, March 2004
O 25 de Abril no tempo que corre, O Mundo em Português Nº 55, Principia, April/May 2004
Os trabalhos da União, O Mundo em Português Nº 56, Principia, September/October 2004
O dia seguinte, O Mundo em Português Nº 57, Principia, September/October 2004
A Europa global, O Mundo em Português Nº 58, IEEI, April/May 2005
Democracia e Terrorismo, O Mundo em Português Nº 59, IEEI, August/September 2005
A redescoberta do Mundo, O Mundo em Português Nº 60, IEEI, December 2005
A Ignorância Perigosa, O Mundo em Português Nº 61, IEEI, February/March 2006
Timor: a quem interessa?, O Mundo em Português Nº 62, IEEI; June/July 2006
O fracasso do unilateralismo armado, O Mundo em Português Nº 63, IEEI, October/November 2006

References

Living people
1944 births
People from Porto
European Union officials